Agmatine, also known as 4-aminobutyl-guanidine, was discovered in 1910 by Albrecht Kossel. It is a chemical substance which is naturally created from the amino acid arginine. Agmatine has been shown to exert modulatory action at multiple molecular targets, notably: neurotransmitter systems, ion channels, nitric oxide (NO) synthesis and polyamine metabolism and this provides bases for further research into potential applications.

History
Agmatine was discovered in 1910 by  Albrecht Kossel. The term stems from A- (for amino-) + g- (from guanidine) + -ma- (from ptomaine) + -in (German)/-ine (English) suffix with insertion of -t- apparently for euphony. A year after its discovery, it was found that Agmatine could increase blood flow in rabbits; however, the physiological relevance of these findings were questioned given the high concentrations (high μM range) required. In the 1920s, researchers in the diabetes clinic of Oskar Minkowski have shown that agmatine can exert mild hypoglycemic effects.  In 1994, endogenous agmatine synthesis in mammals was discovered.

Metabolic pathways

Agmatine biosynthesis by arginine decarboxylation is well-positioned to compete with the principal arginine-dependent pathways, namely: nitrogen metabolism (urea cycle), and polyamine and nitric oxide (NO) synthesis (see illustration 'Agmatine Metabolic Pathways'). Agmatine degradation occurs mainly by hydrolysis, catalyzed by agmatinase into urea and putrescine, the diamine precursor of polyamine biosynthesis. An alternative pathway, mainly in peripheral tissues, is by diamine oxidase-catalyzed oxidation into agmatine-aldehyde, which is in turn converted by aldehyde dehydrogenase into guanidinobutyrate and secreted by the kidneys.

Mechanisms of action
Agmatine was found to exert modulatory actions directly and indirectly at multiple key molecular targets underlying cellular control mechanisms of cardinal importance in health and disease. It is considered capable of exerting its modulatory actions simultaneously at multiple targets. The following outline indicates the categories of control mechanisms and identifies their molecular targets: 
 Neurotransmitter receptors and receptor ionophores. Nicotinic, imidazoline I1 and I2, α2-adrenergic (no intrinsic activity—neither agonist nor antagonist), glutamate NMDAr, and serotonin 5-HT2A and 5HT-3 receptors.
 Ion channels. Including: ATP-sensitive K+ channels, voltage-gated Ca2+ channels, and acid-sensing ion channels (ASICs).
 Membrane transporters. Agmatine specific-selective uptake sites, organic cation transporters (mostly OCT2 subtype), extraneuronal monoamine transporters (ENT), polyamine transporters, and mitochondrial agmatine specific-selective transport system.
 Nitric oxide (NO) synthesis modulation. Both differential inhibition and activation of NO synthase (NOS) isoforms is reported.
 Polyamine metabolism. Agmatine is a precursor for polyamine synthesis, competitive inhibitor of polyamine transport, inducer of spermidine/spermine acetyltransferase (SSAT), and inducer of antizyme.
 Protein ADP-ribosylation. Inhibition of protein arginine ADP-ribosylation.
 Matrix metalloproteases (MMPs). Indirect down-regulation of the enzymes MMP 2 and 9.
 Advanced glycation end product (AGE) formation. Direct blockade of AGEs formation.
 NADPH oxidase. Activation of the enzyme leading to H2O2 production.

Food consumption
Agmatine sulfate injection can increase food intake with carbohydrate preference in satiated, but not in hungry rats and this effect may be mediated by neuropeptide Y. However, supplementation in rat drinking water results in slight reductions in water intake, body weight and blood pressure. Also force feeding with agmatine leads to a reduction in body weight gain during rat development. Also, many fermented foods contain agmatine.

Pharmacokinetics
Agmatine is present in small amounts in plant-, animal-, and fish-derived foodstuff and gut microbial production is an added source for agmatine. Oral agmatine is absorbed from the gastrointestinal tract and readily distributed throughout the body. Rapid elimination from non-brain organs of ingested (un-metabolized) agmatine by the kidneys has indicated a blood half life of about 2 hours.  Also, agmatine is a neuro-modulator, which means it is a substance that modulates chemical transmission of information between the nerve cells.

Research 
A number of potential medical uses for agmatine have been suggested.

Cardiovascular 
Agmatine produces mild reductions in heart rate and blood pressure, apparently by activating both central and peripheral control systems via modulation of several of its molecular targets including: imidazoline receptors subtypes, norepinephrine release and NO production.

Glucose regulation 
Agmatine hypoglycemic effects are the result of simultaneous modulation of several molecular mechanisms involved in blood glucose regulation.

Kidney functions 
Agmatine has been shown to enhance glomerular filtration rate (GFR) and to exert nephroprotective effects.

Neurotransmission 
Agmatine has been discussed as a putative neurotransmitter. It is synthesized in the brain, stored in synaptic vesicles, accumulated by uptake, released by membrane depolarization, and inactivated by agmatinase. Agmatine binds to α2-adrenergic receptor and imidazoline receptor binding sites, and blocks NMDA receptors and other cation ligand-gated channels. However, while agmatine binds to α2-adrenergic receptors, it exerts neither an agonistic nor antagonistic effect on these receptors, lacking any intrinsic activity. Short only of identifying specific ("own") post-synaptic receptors, agmatine in fact, fulfills Henry Dale's criteria for a neurotransmitter and is hence, considered a neuromodulator and co-transmitter. The existence of theoretical agmatinergic-mediated neuronal systems has not yet been demonstrated although the existence of such receptors is implied by its prominence in the mediation of both the central and peripheral nervous systems. Research into agmatine-specific receptors and transmission pathways continues.

Due to its ability to pass through open cationic channels, agmatine has also been used as a surrogate metric of integrated ionic flux into neural tissue upon stimulation. When neural tissue is incubated in agmatine and an external stimulus is applied, only cells with open channels will be filled with agmatine, allowing identification of which cells are sensitive to that stimuli and the degree to which they opened their cationic channels during the stimulation period.

Opioid liability 
Systemic agmatine can potentiate opioid analgesia and prevent tolerance to chronic morphine in laboratory rodents. Since then, cumulative evidence amply shows that agmatine inhibits opioid dependence and relapse in several animal species.

See also 
 Agmatine deiminase
 Agmatinase

References

Further reading 
 

Amines
Guanidines
Metabolism
Imidazoline agonists
Neurotransmitters
NMDA receptor antagonists